Erythrorchis, commonly known as bootlace orchids or as 倒吊兰属 (dao diao lan shu), is a genus of two species of climbing, leafless orchids in the family Orchidaceae. Orchids in this genus are climbing or scrambling vines that cling by small roots, usually climbing on tree trunks. Many-branched flowering stems bear many densely crowded flowers.

Description
Orchids in the genus Erythrorchis are leafless mycotrophic, climbing herbs that cling to surfaces with small, unbranched roots from the main stems. They usually cling to tree trunks. Densely crowded, resupinate flowers are borne on a highly branched flowering stem. The sepals and petals are fleshy, often fused to each other and spread widely, the petals narrower than the sepals. The labellum is relatively wide and has crinkled edges and closely surrounds the column. The fruit are long, thin capsules.

Taxonomy and naming
The genus Erythrorchis was first formally described in 1837 by Carl Ludwig Blume and published in his book Rumphia. The name Erythrorchis is derived from the Ancient Greek words erythros meaning "red" and orchis meaning "testicle" or "orchid".

The two species are-
Erythrorchis altissima (Blume) Blume - Hainan, Taiwan, Cambodia, Assam, Indonesia, Ryukyu Islands, Laos, Malaysia, Myanmar, Philippines, Thailand, Vietnam;
Erythrorchis cassythoides (R.Cunn. ex Lindl.) Garay - Queensland, New South Wales.

See also
 List of Orchidaceae genera

References

External links
 

Vanilloideae genera
Vanilleae